is  the Head coach of the San-en NeoPhoenix in the Japanese B.League.

Career statistics 

|-
| align="left" | 2007-11
| align="left" | Panasonic
| 104 || || 16.7|| .371 || .350 || .692 || 1.5 || 1.0 || 0.2 || 0.1 ||  5.1
|-

Head coaching record

|-
| style="text-align:left;"|Panasonic Trians
| style="text-align:left;"|2012-13
| 6||-||-|||| style="text-align:center;"|-|||-||-||-||
| style="text-align:center;"|-
|-
| style="text-align:left;"|Chiba Jets
| style="text-align:left;"|2016-17
| 60||44||16|||| style="text-align:center;"|3rd in Eastern|||2||0||2||
| style="text-align:center;"|Lost in 1st round
|- 
| style="text-align:left;"|Chiba Jets Funabashi
| style="text-align:left;"|2017-18
| 60||46||14|||| style="text-align:center;"|1st in Eastern|||6||4||2||
| style="text-align:center;"|Runners-up
|- 
| style="text-align:left;"|Chiba Jets Funabashi
| style="text-align:left;"|2018-19
| 60||52||8|||| style="text-align:center;"|1st in Eastern|||5||4||1||
| style="text-align:center;"|Runners-up
|-
| style="text-align:left;"|Chiba Jets Funabashi
| style="text-align:left;"|2019-20
| 40||28||12|||| style="text-align:center;"|3rd in Eastern|||-||-||-||
| style="text-align:center;"|-
|-

References

1977 births
Living people
Japanese basketball coaches
Chiba Jets Funabashi coaches
Nagoya Diamond Dolphins players
Panasonic Trians players
Basketball players at the 2002 Asian Games
Basketball players at the 2006 Asian Games
Asian Games competitors for Japan